Cyana nyasica is a moth of the family Erebidae. It was described by George Hampson in 1918. It is found in Malawi and South Africa.
There are two subspecies:
 C. n. nyasica (Hampson, 1918), found in Malawi
 C. n. kruegeri Karisch, 2013, found in South Africa

References

Cyana
Lepidoptera of Malawi
Lepidoptera of South Africa
Moths of Sub-Saharan Africa
Moths described in 1918